Borut Mavrič (born 27 March 1970) is a former Slovenian footballer. He represented Slovenia internationally.

Club career
Mavrič was born in Šempeter pri Gorici.

Greuther Fürth signed Mavrič in summer 2004 from Olimpija in a one-year deal and later signed a two-year extension in March 2005. He was released in March 2007, returning to Slovenia.

References

1970 births
Living people
People from Šempeter pri Gorici
Slovenian footballers
Slovenian expatriate footballers
Association football goalkeepers
NK Primorje players
ND Gorica players
NK Olimpija Ljubljana (1945–2005) players
SpVgg Greuther Fürth players
Slovenian PrvaLiga players
2. Bundesliga players
Expatriate footballers in Germany
Slovenian expatriate sportspeople in Germany
Slovenia international footballers